Benzoylthiomethylecgonine is a cocaine analog which includes a sulfur in replacement of an oxygen on the single bonded benzoyl ester, resulting in lower electronegativity than the parent compound.

See also
Salicylmethylecgonine
2'-Acetoxycocaine
4'-Fluorococaine

References

Tropanes
Dopamine reuptake inhibitors
Stimulants
Local anesthetics
Methyl esters